Mary Jane Jacob is an American curator, writer, and educator from Chicago, Illinois. She is a professor at the School of the Art Institute of Chicago, and is the Executive Director of Exhibitions and Exhibition Studies. She has held posts as Chief Curator at the Museum of Contemporary Art, Los Angeles and at the Museum of Contemporary Art, Chicago.

Since 1990 Jacob has been a pioneer in the areas of public, site-specific, and socially engaged art. Jacob is the author and editor of many key texts including Conversations at the Castle: Changing Audiences and Contemporary Art (1996) and Culture in Action: New Public Art in Chicago (1993).

Jacob has mounted exhibitions, and created public art opportunities that have featured the work of some of the most influential artists in contemporary art including Mark Dion, Suzanne Lacy, Ernesto Pujol, J. Morgan Puett, Pablo Helguera, Marina Abramović, and Alfredo Jaar. The Women's Caucus for Art honored Jacob as a 2010 recipient of the organization's Lifetime Achievement Award.

Jacob received her M.A. in the History of Art and Museum Studies from the University of Michigan, Ann Arbor.

Curatorial approach

Jacob has an approach to curation that focuses heavily on site, history, social context, and audience relationships. These approaches are most evident in her influential project Culture in Action: Public Art in Chicago.

In September 2014, she opened an exhibition, A Lived Practice, co-curated with Kate Zeller, and launched a four-volume series ob Chicago Social Practice History distributed by the University of Chicago Press.

Exhibitions and projects
In 1991 and again in 2000–2008 Jacob was the curator of visual arts projects for Spoleto Festival USA in Charleston South Carolina. This was the site of Places With a Past (1991) and Places With a Future (2005).

In 1996 Jacob was the curator of Conversations at the Castle: Changing Audiences and Contemporary Art as part of the Arts Festival of Atlanta  for the 1996 Olympics.

Books and publications 
Jacob has written and edited over three dozen books and exhibition publications. Her most recent books include Dewey for Artists (University of Chicago Press, 2018), The Studio Reader: On the Space of Artists (University of Chicago Press, 2010) and Learning Mind: Experience into Art (University of California Press, 2010).

Teaching 
Jacob is a professor at the School of the Art Institute of Chicago in Sculpture. Jacob is the executive director of exhibitions and exhibition studies.

Museum affiliations
From 1976-80, Jacob was the associate curator of modern art at the Detroit Art Institute. She served as the chief curator at the Museums of Contemporary Art in Chicago from 1980-86. She served as the chief curator at the Museum of Contemporary Art Los Angeles from 1986-89.

References

External links
Official website
Mary Jane Jacob, The Creative Time Summit
"Culture in Action", Frieze Magazine.
"The Energetic Persistence of Water: An Interview with Mary Jane Jacob", Art21 Magazine.

Living people
American art curators
American women curators
Horace H. Rackham School of Graduate Studies alumni
Place of birth missing (living people)
Year of birth missing (living people)
School of the Art Institute of Chicago faculty
American women academics